Walther Siegmund-Schultze (6 July 1916 – 6 March 1993) was a German musicologist. He was the elder brother of musicologist Hella Brock.

Biography
Siegmund-Schultze was born in Schweinitz (Elster). In July 1940 he was promoted to  Dr. phil. at the Philosophical Faculty of Universität Breslau with Mozarts Vokal- und Instrumentalmusik in ihren motivisch-thematischen Beziehungen under Franz Arnold Schmitz. From 1965 to 1970 he was Professor of Musicology in Leipzig. From 1956 to 1981 he was Professor and director of the Institute for Musicology at the  Martin Luther University of Halle-Wittenberg. He died in Halle (Saale).

Awards
 1959 Handel Prize
 1987 Telemann Prize

References

External links
 

1916 births
1993 deaths
20th-century German musicologists